The Magic City Classic is an annual American football "classic" that features Alabama A&M University and Alabama State University, the two largest historically black universities in the state.  It is played at Legion Field in Birmingham (nicknamed the "Magic City"). The classic has become one of the highest attended Division I FCS (formerly Division I-AA) games in the nation and the largest event in Birmingham carrying a nearly $25 million economic impact. The stadium attendance averages over 60,000 annually.

The first game between the two schools was played in 1924.  It has been an uninterrupted, annual tradition since 1945 and has been played at Legion Field since 1940.

The classic is the largest HBCU event in the nation attracting nearly 200,000 participants. The Alabama A&M Bulldogs lead the series with a record of 44–40–3 all-time (as of 2022).

Other activities
Many festivities are held in conjunction with the game, including a pep rally, comedy show, scholarship breakfast, concert/festival, soirees, tailgating, block parties, alumni gatherings, 2-hour parade, and a popular "Battle of the Bands" between AAMU’s Marching Maroon and White Band and ASU's Mighty Marching Hornets.  Festivities begin the week of Saturday's game.

In recent years, the classic has attracted numerous African-American celebrities, public figures, and elected officials to Birmingham.

History

See also
 List of NCAA college football rivalry games
 List of black college football classics

References

External links
 Official website

Alabama A&M Bulldogs football
Alabama State Hornets football
Sports in Birmingham, Alabama
American football in Alabama
Black college football classics
1924 establishments in Alabama